Theo Müller (January 29, 1940) is a German businessman. He is the head of the dairy company Müller, which was founded by his grandfather.

Early life
Theo Müller was born in Aretsried, Germany, in 1940, the son of Alois Müller.

Career
The Müller company was founded in 1896 by his grandfather Ludwig Müller in Aretsried, Bavaria. In 1938, his father Alois Müller took over. Theo took over in 1971, when the dairy business only had four employees.

Today, apart from the dairy businesses, Theo Müller Group has a packing company (Optipack), logistics (Culina Group), transportation (Fahrzeugtechnik Aretsried), fruit processing (Muller Naturfarm) and a fish restaurant chain (Nordsee). More recent acquisitions have included companies making chilled salad, sauces and dressings, speciality fish and baked goods.

In 2012, the company purchased Robert Wiseman Dairies, which supplies 30% of the UK's fresh milk market, for £280 million. In November 2014, the company agreed to buy Dairy Crest's milk business for £80 million. Theo Müller commented, "Bringing the two dairy operations together will enhance the merged business's ability to compete and will ensure that customers continue to receive quality products at low prices".

Müller is the sole owner, and as of 2015, Ronald Kers is the CEO, replacing , who retired in 2015. The company now employs more than 20,000 workers.

Personal life
Müller has nine children, seven with his wife Hanna Bittmann, whom he divorced in 1995, and two daughters with his partner Ines Hüvel. His eldest son, Stefan Müller, is a board member of Theo Müller Group.

In 1995, Müller survived a kidnapping attempt in which a pistol and electrical-shock equipment was held to his head. He jumped out of the car, and was working again later that afternoon.

He has lived in Erlenbach, near Zurich, Switzerland since 2003. In an interview with Der Spiegel in 2003, Müller explained that he and his children were all moving to Switzerland to avoid having to pay Germany's 30% inheritance tax.

References

Further reading
"Müller-Milch: Theo gegen den Rest der Welt" by Stefan Lüscher, Handelszeitung, 28 June 2005 (in German)

1940 births
Living people
Businesspeople from Augsburg
German billionaires
German expatriates in Switzerland
People from Augsburg (district)
20th-century German businesspeople
21st-century German businesspeople